During the Second World War Tostock Park was a sub-station of the United States Army Air Force, located in Tostock, near Bury St Edmunds, Suffolk. It was allocated Station No. 502, and supported by RAF Burtonwood.

The base was garrisoned by African-American soldiers from the 1517 Quartermaster (Battalion Mobile) (Aviation), consisting of:
 1970 Quartermaster Truck Company (Aviation)
 2023 Quartermaster Truck Company (Aviation)
 2024 Quartermaster Truck Company (Aviation)
 2104 Quartermaster Truck Company (Aviation) based in the neighbouring village of Drinkstone.

References

Installations of the United States Army Air Forces